The 2020–21 CSA Women's Provincial Programme was the 26th edition of South Africa's provincial one-day cricket tournament. The tournament was initially scheduled to begin in January 2021, but was delayed due to the COVID-19 pandemic, and the format was changed. The tournament began in February 2021 and ran until April 2021, with teams competing in four groups, each located in a different city under COVID-19 protocols. Due to this, there was no overall winner.

Competition format
The 16 teams were divided into two tiers of two groups apiece. The top tier consisted of six teams, divided into Pool A and Pool B. Each team played each other team twice, therefore playing four matches overall. The second tier consisted of ten teams, divided into Pool C and Pool D. Each team played each other once, therefore playing four matches overall. Matches were played using a one day format, with 50 overs per side.

The winners of Pools C and D played-off for promotion to the top tier, whilst the bottom-placed teams in Pools A and B played-off, with the loser being relegated to the bottom tier.

The groups worked on a points system with positions being based on the total points. Points were awarded as follows:

Win: 4 points 
Tie: 3 points 
Loss: 0 points.
Abandoned/No Result: 2 points.

Teams

Tables

Top 6

Pool A

Pool B

Second Tier

Pool C

Pool D

Play-offs

Relegation

Promotion

References

CSA Women's Provincial Programme
Domestic cricket competitions in 2020–21
2020–21 South African cricket season
2021 in South African women's sport